The rainbow sardine (Dussumieria acuta), also known as common sprat, dwarf round herring, rainbow herring, and sharpnosed sprat, is a bony fish important to aquaculture and commercial fisheries.

Description
The color of the rainbow sardine is iridescent blue with a shiny gold or brass line below, which quickly fades after death; the hind margin of the tail is broadly dark. The fish has a w-shaped pelvic scute; an isthmus tapering evenly forward; and more anal fin rays. There are 14 to 18 anal soft rays. The maximum length recorded is 20 cm.

Distribution and habitat
Marine and estuarine species, the rainbow sardine can be found in Indo-Pacific regions such as the Persian Gulf (and perhaps south to Somalia), Bangladesh, Pakistan, India, Sri Lanka and Malaysia to Indonesia (Kalimantan) and the Philippines. The species now also occurs in the Mediterranean, having invaded as a Lessepsian migrant through the Suez Canal.

See also
 Sardine
 Slender rainbow sardine Dussumieria elopsoides
 List of common commercial fish of Sri Lanka

References

rainbow sardine
Commercial fish
Fish of the Red Sea
Marine fauna of South Asia
Marine fish of Southeast Asia
rainbow sardine